Acidiferrobacteraceae is a family of bacteria.

References

Gammaproteobacteria

Gammaproteobacteria